The St Augustine's by-election of 1911 was held on 7 July 1911.  The by-election was held due to the incumbent Conservative MP, Aretas Akers-Douglas becoming Viscount Chilston.  It was won by the Conservative candidate Ronald McNeill, who was unopposed.

References

1911 in England
1911 elections in the United Kingdom
By-elections to the Parliament of the United Kingdom in Kent constituencies
1910s in Kent
Unopposed by-elections to the Parliament of the United Kingdom (need citation)
July 1911 events